Knockout is a fictional character, a supervillainess in the DC Comics universe. She first appeared in Superboy (vol. 4) #1 (February 1994), and was created by Karl Kesel and Tom Grummett.

A former Female Fury warrior from the hellish planet Apokolips like Big Barda, Knockout also escaped to Earth. Though while Barda became a superheroine, Knockout became a supervillainess. She later joined the Secret Six team, which committed actions more as antiheroes.

Fictional character biography

Superboy (vol. 4)
Knockout first appeared shortly after Superboy (Kon-El) moved to Hawaii. Using her superstrength, she fought and flirted with Superboy just for the fun of it. Her hidden identity was that of a super strong stripper who worked at a club called the BoomBoom Room. Later, she was recruited to join Amanda Waller's Suicide Squad for an attack against the international crime cartel Silicon Dragons. She joined Captain Boomerang, Deadshot, Sidearm, and King Shark on the Suicide Squad. The Suicide Squad had to overcome betrayal and overwhelming enemies, and in the end, Knockout was supposedly killed when the Squad left her and King Shark in the exploding base. She later returned alive, and assisted Superboy in a battle against Valor, although she and Superboy did spar. She turned up shortly thereafter and teamed up with Superboy in several of his adventures. Soon, however, her past caught up with her. She was originally from Apokolips, a former member of Granny Goodness's Female Furies. After Big Barda escaped with Mister Miracle, Knockout decided to leave the Furies as well. At one point when she was chained to a wall in the Fire Pits as punishment, she broke her chains and leapt into the fires. As she did so, a Boom Tube opened and took her to Hawaii.

The Female Furies arrived on Hawaii to reclaim Knockout. A battle broke out between Superboy, Knockout, and a small contingent of police officers against the Furies. One police officer died during the battle, but the Furies were driven off when Dubbilex used his mental abilities to convince them that Knockout had died in the battle as well. Dubbilex investigated the murder of the police officer, using his mental powers to scan the memories of most of the survivors. They soon realized that Knockout had killed the officer simply because he was in her way.

The police attempted to bring her in, but Superboy refused to believe she was guilty, forcing the two to briefly hide from the law. The two encountered an explorer named Victor Volcanum, whom Knockout hoped Superboy would kill as a sign of deference to her. Superboy refused, and thus Knockout killed Volcanum instead. Upon seeing Knockout's true colors, Superboy managed to defeat her and bring her into custody.

Knockout never escaped custody for the rest of the Superboy series, as anti-gravity items were used to keep her restrained.

In the storyline Hypertension, Superboy met a number of variations of Knockouts during his journey through Hypertime, one of which was an agent of Black Zero, an alternate adult version of Superboy. Another notable version gave her life to save Superboy and the Challengers of the Unknown from a horde of rampaging Doomsdays.

Since then she has been revealed to be on the loose and has joined up with the Society as seen in Villains United. In that book, she was revealed to have joined the Society as a mole at the request of her lover, Scandal Savage, a member of the Secret Six.

Secret Six

Knockout joined the Secret Six alongside Scandal. The team successfully assassinated a jail warden in North Korea, allowing the Secret Six to relax for a time. Each member celebrated in his or her own way when a team of assassins attacked each member, save Catman.

Knockout was almost killed when she was shot by an assassin with a Thanagarian sniper rifle. The shot implanted a bomb in her skin and when Scandal refused to leave her side, she threw Scandal from the blast range telling her they would meet again in the afterlife. After the bomb went off, Scandal scrambled through the debris to find Knockout miraculously still alive, though horribly burned and unconscious. Knockout received medical treatment for her extensive injuries but recovered fully due to her body's Apokoliptian regenerative capabilities.

Knockout rejoined the Secret Six in hopes of finding the person behind their attempted assassinations, but was injured when Rag Doll attacked them due to Doctor Psycho's manipulations, although her regeneration prevented any lasting damage. Although she was Scandal's lover, Knockout was found having sex with Deadshot, when Scandal caught the two in the act. It was revealed that Knockout had slept with Floyd because she misunderstood the sexual exclusivity of her relationship with Scandal; Apokolips lacks any similar social convention and she was surprised but apologetic that she had caused Scandal pain. Scandal and Knockout were together when the series ended and Scandal still refers to her as her girlfriend.

Knockout, along with the rest of the Secret Six, were hired by a Russian mercenary and battled Barbara Gordon's team in Birds of Prey. Knockout engaged in a one-on-one fight against Big Barda, a battle which continued above all other concerns (including the resurrection of Ice), and despite Barda breaking her arm, Knockout's refusal to yield left the fight with no clear victor.

Weeks later, after Scandal suggested that her bad mood was the result of her inconclusive encounter with Barda, Knockout went to the Birds of Prey headquarters looking to continue their fight. Upon her arrival, she was tracked and killed by Infinity-Man, adding her name to the list of murdered New Gods. She recognized her assailant and requested one last phone call to Scandal, the contents of which are unknown.

Knockout made a possible post-mortem appearance in Secret Six (vol. 2) #1, when the team tries to cheer Scandal up with a stripper dressed like Knockout. Scandal, in her drunken stupor, has a vision, possibly a hallucination, of Knockout comforting her, though Scandal Savage later noted she didn't "see Knockout inside" when she accidentally meets the stripper—who introduces herself as Liana Kerzner—while shopping and subsequently starts dating her.

Scandal is shown to have kept the "Get out of Hell Free" card the Six had been tasked with capturing and had falsely reported lost or destroyed. When Ragdoll is discovered to have stolen it, Scandal murders him. Afterwards, Black Alice—as her final act before leaving the team—teleports the rest of the team to Hell to retrieve the card, where to Scandal's horror she discovers a brainwashed Knockout betrothed to Ragdoll as part of his elevation to the hierarchy of the Underworld. An exceptionally violent fight breaks out, resulting in the entire team with Knockout in tow escaping back to Earth with the certain knowledge of their ultimate destination.

Following her resurrection and a period of mental recovery, she rejoins the Secret Six and accompanies the team on a mission to Gotham to kill several of Batman's allies. While in Gotham, Scandal proposes a polygamous marriage between Knockout, herself, and the stripper that she had been dating while Knockout was still dead. Knockout accepts the proposal just prior to the team being ambushed by a number of superheroes who come to assist Batman, resulting in a massive battle. Knockout is quickly blasted in the face by Captain Atom, and falls to the ground next to Scandal. The two women hold hands one last time, with Knockout referring to Scandal as her "wife" before losing consciousness. The fates of Knockout and the other members of the Secret Six (save for Bane) are ultimately left ambiguous as the series ends.

During the next Secret Six series set in the New 52, both Scandal and Knockout are shown to be perfectly healthy and living in freedom instead of prison, and are still happily together with Liana. The three make plans to have a child together, and Scandal has even chosen the man she wants to be the donor.

Post-DC Rebirth
Knockout was among a motley assortment of supervillains and superheroes yanked from different timelines during the Generations event. Set against the heroes at first, she and the villains join with them at the final battle.

With DC's Infinite Frontier relaunch, Knockout turns up with a group of supervillains gathered by Clayface (Basil Karlo) who volunteer to help Catwoman defend her neighborhood in Gotham City from the city's new fascistic mayor and paramilitary enforcement militia.

Powers and abilities
Knockout is a highly trained warrior and master of unarmed combat. Unlike the other Female Furies, she is not armed with her own weapon. (If she had one back when she was a Fury, Knockout wasn't able to bring it with her to Earth.) In common with most other New Gods of the planet Apokolips, she has immense strength, stamina, and durability, as well as a healing factor.

In other media
Knockout appears in Suicide Squad: Hell to Pay, voiced by Cissy Jones. This version is a former Female Fury who works under Vandal Savage alongside her lover Scandal Savage. While attempting to retrieve a "Get Out of Hell Free" card for Vandal, Knockout and Scandal run afoul of the Suicide Squad before the former is betrayed by Vandal, who orders his men to kill her. Despite this, Knockout is hospitalized.

References

Characters created by Karl Kesel
Comics characters introduced in 1994
DC Comics aliens
DC Comics characters with accelerated healing
DC Comics characters with superhuman strength
DC Comics deities
DC Comics extraterrestrial supervillains
DC Comics female supervillains
DC Comics LGBT supervillains
Fictional bisexual females
Fictional lesbians
Fictional characters with immortality
Fictional characters with superhuman durability or invulnerability
New Gods of Apokolips

de:New Gods#Knockout